Lorca Atlético Club de Fútbol was a Spanish football team based in Lorca, in the Region of Murcia. Founded in 2010, it held its home games at the Estadio Francisco Artés Carrasco, with a capacity of 8,120 seats. The club was relegated to Preferente Autonómica for not paying its players and disappeared in August 2012.

History
In July 2010 Cristóbal Sánchez Arcas, an entrepreneur from Lorca, Spain, bought Murcia-based club Sangonera Atlético CF and moved it to his city. It started competing professionally in the third division. 

In June 2012, Lorca Atlético was doubly relegated: after finishing the season in 16th position, it suffered a further drop to the regional championships for failing to pay its players.

Season to season

2 seasons in Segunda División B

References

External links
Official website 
Futbolme team profile 

Association football clubs established in 2010
Football clubs in the Region of Murcia
Lorca, Spain
Divisiones Regionales de Fútbol clubs
2010 establishments in Spain
Association football clubs disestablished in 2012